The River Fleet is the largest of London's subterranean rivers, all of which today contain foul water for treatment. It has been used as a sewer since the development of Joseph Bazalgette's London sewer system in the mid 19th century with the water being treated at Beckton Sewage Treatment Works. Its headwaters are two streams on Hampstead Heath, each of which was dammed into a series of ponds—the Hampstead Ponds and the Highgate Ponds—in the 18th century. At the southern edge of Hampstead Heath these descend underground as sewers and join in Camden Town. The waters flow  from the ponds .

The river gives its name to Fleet Street, the eastern end of which is at what was the crossing over the river known as Fleet Bridge, and is now the site of Ludgate Circus.

Name
The river's name is derived from the Anglo-Saxon  "tidal inlet". In Anglo-Saxon times, the Fleet served as a dock for shipping.

The lower reaches of the river were known as the Holbourne (or Oldbourne), whence Holborn derived its name.

The river gives its name to Fleet Street which runs from Ludgate Circus to Temple Bar at the Strand. In the 1970s, a London Underground tube line was planned to lie under the line of Fleet Street, provisionally named the Fleet line. However, it was renamed the Jubilee line in 1977, and plans for the part of the route through the City of London were subsequently abandoned. An alternative name for the River Fleet was 'Holborn', deriving from the word 'Bourne', cf. 'Burn', meaning 'river' or 'stream'. This gave its name to that part of London.

Course and tributaries

The Fleet rises on Hampstead Heath as two sources, which flow on the surface as the Hampstead Ponds and the Highgate Ponds. They then go underground, pass under Kentish Town, join in Camden Town, and flow onwards towards St Pancras Old Church, which was sited on the river's banks. From there the river passed in a sinuous course which is responsible for the unusual building line adjacent to King's Cross station; the German Gymnasium faced the river banks, and the curve of the Great Northern Hotel follows that of the Fleet, which passes alongside it. King's Cross was originally named Battle Bridge, a corruption of Broad Ford Bridge referring to an older crossing of the Fleet. In turn John Nelson in his The History, Topography, and Antiquities of the Parish of St. Mary Islington of 1811 linked a supposed Roman army camp found under some nearby brick fields with the site of Boudica's final battle, based only on his comparison of the local topography with the scant description of the battlefield supplied by the near-contemporary historian Tacitus. The name was changed in the 19th century to refer to an unpopular statue of George IV erected in 1830 but, although it was replaced after only fifteen years, the name remains.

From there, it heads down King's Cross Road and other streets, including Farringdon Road and Farringdon Street. The line of the former river marks the western boundary of Clerkenwell, the eastern boundary of Holborn and a small part of the eastern boundary of St Pancras. In this way it continues to form part of the boundary of the modern London Boroughs of Camden and Islington.

At Farringdon Street the valley broadens out and straightens to join the Thames beneath Blackfriars Bridge. In the lower reaches, the valley slopes in the surrounding streets which explains the presence of three viaduct bridges (at Holborn Viaduct across Farringdon Street, another over Shoe Lane, and another on Rosebery Avenue where it crosses Warner Street).

Lamb's Conduit
A small tributary flowed west to east to join the Fleet near Mount Pleasant. This was later utilised to feed Lamb's Conduit. The line of the original brook formed Holborn's boundary with St Pancras to the north. The sweeping curve of Roger Street is part of that boundary line.

Fagswell Brook
The Fagswell Brook (also spelled Faggeswell) was a tributary that joined the Fleet from the east and partially formed the northern boundary of the City of London. The brook flowed east to west on a line approximating to Charterhouse Street and Charterhouse Square. In 1603, the historian John Stow described its demise:

A part of the course close to Charterhouse Square was excavated as part of the Crossrail project.

Today

The Fleet, which is a now a sewer that follows its route, can be heard through a grating in Ray Street, Clerkenwell in front of The Coach pub (formerly the Coach and Horses), just off Farringdon Road. The position of the river can still be seen in the surrounding streetscape with Ray Street and its continuation, Warner Street, lying in a valley where the river once flowed. It can also be heard through a grid in the centre of Charterhouse Street, where it joins Farringdon Road (on the Smithfield side of the junction). In wet weather (when the sewer system is overloaded), and on a very low tide, the murky Fleet can be seen gushing into the Thames from the Thameswalk exit of Blackfriars station, immediately under Blackfriars bridge. (The tunnel exit shown in the picture can be seen much more clearly from directly above.)

The former mayor of London, Boris Johnson, proposed opening short sections of the Fleet and other rivers for ornamental purposes, although the Environment Agency – which manages the project – is pessimistic that the Fleet can be among those uncovered.

History
In Roman times, the Fleet was a major river, with its estuary possibly containing the oldest tidal mill in the world. The river secured the western flank of the Roman City.

Many wells were built along its banks, and some on springs (Bagnigge Wells, Clerkenwell) and St Bride's Well, were reputed to have healing qualities; in the 13th century the river was called River of Wells. The small lane at the south-west end of New Bridge Street is called Watergate because it was the river entrance to Bridewell Palace.

As London grew, the river became increasingly a sewer. The area came to be characterised by poor-quality housing and prisons: Bridewell Palace itself was converted into a prison; Newgate, Fleet and Ludgate prisons were all built in that area.  In 1728 Alexander Pope wrote in his Dunciad, "To where Fleet-ditch with disemboguing streams / Rolls the large tribute of dead dogs to Thames / The king of dykes! than whom no sluice of mud / with deeper sable blots the silver flood".

Following the Great Fire of London in 1666, architect Christopher Wren's proposal for widening the river was rejected. Rather, the Fleet was converted into the New Canal, completed in 1680 under the supervision of Robert Hooke. Newcastle Close and Old Seacoal Lane (now just short alleyways off Farringdon Street) recall the wharves that used to line this canal, especially used by the coastal coal trade from the north-east of England.  (An adjacent narrow road, Seacoal Lane, also existed until the late 20th century, when the present building fronting onto Farringdon Street was built, perhaps suggesting that a new wharf had been built near the old one.)

The upper canal, unpopular and unused, was from 1737 enclosed between Holborn and Ludgate Circus to form the "Fleet Market". The lower part, the section from Ludgate Circus to the Thames, had been covered by 1769 for the opening of the new Blackfriars Bridge and was consequently named "New Bridge Street".

The development of the Regent's Canal and urban growth covered the river in King's Cross and Camden from 1812. The Fleet Market was closed during the 1860s with the construction of Farringdon Road and Farringdon Street as a highway to the north and the Metropolitan Railway, while the final upper section of the river was covered when Hampstead was expanded in the 1870s.

The history of the River Fleet was documented by the nineteenth century artist and historian Anthony Crosby. His sketches and notes  are held in the Crosby Collection at the London Metropolitan Archives. The archive has been used extensively by researchers, historians and publishers to provide images and contemporary descriptions of the 19th century River Fleet during the period where it was undergoing significant change.

Cultural references

Fleet, a sequence of poems by Paul O'Prey published in 2021, traces the course of the buried river.

See also
 Tributaries of the River Thames
 Subterranean rivers of London
 List of rivers in England

References

External links

 Sub-Urban.com – River Fleet
 Photos From The Buried River Fleet
 Chesca Potter, "The River of Wells"
 Map showing Ray Street Bridge
 Google Earth view of Hampstead Heath, showing the Hampstead Ponds and the Highgate Ponds.

Geography of the London Borough of Camden
Geography of the City of London
Subterranean rivers of London
1Fleet